The 1972 Individual Long Track World Championship was the second edition of the FIM speedway Individual Long Track World Championship. The event was held on 9 July 1972 in Mühldorf, West Germany.

The world title was won by Ivan Mauger of New Zealand for a second successive year.

Final Classification 

Key
 E = Eliminated (no further ride)

References 

1972
Sport in West Germany
Sports competitions in West Germany
Motor
Motor